Dasybasis chilensis is a species of deer fly in the family Tabanidae.

Distribution
Chile, Argentina.

References

Tabanidae
Insects described in 1838
Diptera of South America
Taxa named by Pierre-Justin-Marie Macquart